Michaeliodes is a genus of snout moths. It was described by Roesler in 1969. It contains only one species, Michaeliodes friesei, which is found in Albania and Greece.

References

Phycitini
Monotypic moth genera
Moths of Europe
Pyralidae genera